The Herrold Bridge is a historic structure located near the unincorporated community of Herrold, Iowa, United States. Completed in 1921, this concrete cantilevered deck girder bridge replaced an earlier timber pile structure. It was designed by the Iowa State Highway Commission the previous year, and the Polk County Board of Supervisors awarded the construction contract to Ben Cole of Ames. The total cost of construction was $24,283.36. The bridge features three arched concrete deck girder spans that are cantilevered from concrete abutments and piers. It is considered one of the most technologically significant of Iowa's concrete girder bridges. The bridge was listed on the National Register of Historic Places in 1998. While it remains in place, the Herrold Bridge was replaced by a newer span slightly downstream.

See also
 
 
 
 
 List of bridges on the National Register of Historic Places in Iowa
 National Register of Historic Places listings in Linn County, Iowa

References

Bridges completed in 1921
Bridges in Polk County, Iowa
National Register of Historic Places in Polk County, Iowa
Road bridges on the National Register of Historic Places in Iowa
Concrete bridges in the United States
Girder bridges in the United States